Rowena King (born 14 February 1969) is a British stage, film and television actress.

Early life and education
King was born 14 February 1969 in London to Phyllis Ndlandha from Soweto South Africa and British born, John King, an entrepreneur and designer. She spent her childhood with her parents and three older sisters in Hertfordshire. She attended formal dramatic studies at the Mountview Academy of Theatre Arts, from where King transitioned to ensemble work with the Royal Shakespeare Company.

Film and television
King first appeared in the 1991 drama London Kills Me. She had recurring roles in a number of UK television series such as Framed, Screen One, Full Stretch, Just a Gigolo, To Play the King, Tales of the South Seas and Wonderful You.

King is known to the British public for her portrayal of Amelie in Wide Sargasso Sea, the 1993 film adaptation, directed by John Duigan, of Jean Rhys's 1966 novel of the same name; and as Rachel Morris in director Julian Richards' 1996 horror film Darklands. Her role as "attendant to Gertrude" in Kenneth Branagh's four-hour screen version of Hamlet drew on King's Shakespearean background, but provided her with relatively little screen time. In 2006 she had a secondary role as Heather in Peter Levin's A Perfect Day, starring Rob Lowe and Christopher Lloyd. In 2007 she appeared as Angelica in Rob Reiner's The Bucket List with Morgan Freeman and Jack Nicholson. King's television credits include guest roles in Grey's Anatomy, Eli Stone, The All New Alexei Sayle Show, Nip/Tuck, Lie to Me, Death in Paradise, among others; and recurring roles in Breaking News, Half & Half and The Wrong Mans.

In 2015/16 King played a supporting role in 8 episodes of the ABC television drama series Of Kings and Prophets, based on the Books of Samuel. The series follows an ensemble of characters including Saul and David, the successive Kings of Israel, their families, and their political rivals.

Filmography

Film

Television

References

External links 
 
 

1970 births
Living people
British stage actresses
British film actresses
British television actresses
English people of Liberian descent
21st-century British actresses
Alumni of the Mountview Academy of Theatre Arts
Actresses from London
People from Hertfordshire
20th-century British actresses
20th-century English women
20th-century English people
21st-century English women
21st-century English people